Swiss Cup 2008–09 was the 84th season of Switzerland's annual cup competition. It began on 20 September with the first games of Round 1 and ended on 20 May 2009 with the Final held at Stade de Suisse, Berne. The winners earned a place in the play-off round of the UEFA Europa League. FC Basel were the defending champions.

Participating clubs
Nine Super League teams (FC Vaduz are from Liechtenstein and thus play in the Liechtenstein Cup 2008–09) and all sixteen Challenge League clubs entered this year's competition, as well as thirteen teams from 1. Liga and 26 teams from lower leagues (their level within the Swiss league pyramid is given in parentheses below). Teams from 1. Liga and below had to qualify through separate qualifying rounds within their leagues.

Round 1
Teams from Super League and Challenge League were seeded in this round. In a match, the home advantage was granted to the team from the lower league, if applicable.

|colspan="3" style="background-color:#99CCCC"|19 September 2008

|-
|colspan="3" style="background-color:#99CCCC"|20 September 2008

 

|-
|colspan="3" style="background-color:#99CCCC"|21 September 2008

|}
The match between Wacker Grenchen and FC Alle was abandoned after 119 minutes because of violent altercations among players, coaches and spectators. Both teams had originally been expelled from the competition. However, upon a successful appeal, FC Alle were awarded the victory and gained permission to compete in the second round.

Round 2
The winners of Round 1 played in this round. Teams from Super League were seeded. In a match, the home advantage was granted to the team from the lower league, if applicable.

|colspan="3" style="background-color:#99CCCC"|17 October 2008

|-
|colspan="3" style="background-color:#99CCCC"|18 October 2008

|-
|colspan="3" style="background-color:#99CCCC"|19 October 2008

|-
|colspan="3" style="background-color:#99CCCC"|29 October 2008

|}

Round 3
The winners of Round 2 played in this round. In a match, the home advantage was granted to the team from the lower league, if applicable. Some games were postponed due to snow, and subsequently played elsewhere.

|colspan="3" style="background-color:#99CCCC"|22 November 2008

|-
|colspan="3" style="background-color:#99CCCC"|23 November 2008

|-
|colspan="3" style="background-color:#99CCCC"|10 December 2008

|}
The match was played at Stade de la Maladière, Neuchâtel.
The match was played at Stade de Suisse, Berne.

Quarter-finals
The winners of Round 3 played in this round.

Semi-finals
The winners of the quarter-finals played in this round. As in the previous round, matches were openly drawn, meaning that the team drawn first in a match earned the home game.

Final

External links
 Official site

References

Swiss Cup seasons
Swiss Cup, 2008-09
Swiss Cup